Dolichoderus scabridus is a species of ant in the genus Dolichoderus. Described by Roger in 1862, the species is among the most frequently encountered species in Australia.

References

Dolichoderus
Hymenoptera of Australia
Insects described in 1862